Arviz may refer to:
 Arviz, Birjand
 Arviz, Nehbandan